Eumeneia or Eumenia was a town of ancient Phrygia, situated on the river Glaucus, on the road from Dorylaeum to Apameia. It is said to have received its name from Attalus II, who named the town after his brother and predecessor, Eumenes II. As of the 19th century, ruins and curious sculptures still marked the place as the site of an ancient town. On some coins found there we read Εὐμενέων Ἀχαίων, which seems to allude to the destruction of Corinth, at which troops of Attalus were present. The district of the town bore the name Eumenetica Regio, mentioned by Pliny the Elder. It inhabited during Hellenistic, Roman, and Byzantine times; for a time it also bore the name Fulvia.

It was the seat of a bishop; no longer a residential bishopric, under the name Eumenia it remains a titular see of the Roman Catholic Church.

Its site is located near Işıklı in Asiatic Turkey.

References

Populated places in Phrygia
Former populated places in Turkey
Roman towns and cities in Turkey
Populated places of the Byzantine Empire
History of Denizli Province
Catholic titular sees in Asia
Attalid colonies
Populated places established in the 2nd century BC
Çivril District